Hugo Herrestrup (29 January 1933 – 22 September 2009) was a Danish film actor. He appeared in 35 films between 1953 and 1996. He was born in Copenhagen, Denmark.

Selected filmography
 Father of Four (1953)
 Sømand i knibe (1960)
 Det skete på Møllegården (1960)
 The Last Winter (1960)
 Crazy Paradise (1962)
 Frøken Nitouche (1963)
 Bussen (1963)
 It's Nifty in the Navy (1965)
 Hooray for the Blue Hussars (1970)

References

External links

1933 births
2009 deaths
Danish male film actors
Male actors from Copenhagen